William Coffey may refer to:

 William Coffey (VC) (1829–1875), Irish recipient of the Victoria Cross
 William Coffey (cricketer)  (1885–?), Irish cricketer
 William S. Coffey, American lawyer, politician, and judge from New York
 Willie Coffey (born 1958), Scottish National Party (SNP) politician